Santiago Martínez Delgado (1906–1954) was a Colombian painter, sculptor, art historian and writer. He established a reputation as a prominent muralist during the 1940s and is also known for his watercolors, oil paintings, illustrations and woodcarvings.

Martínez attended the Chicago Academy of Fine Arts under the tutelage of Ruth VanSickle Ford. In 1933, he was awarded the Logan Medal of the arts for his mural at the "Century of Progress" International Exhibition in Chicago. During these years in Chicago, he produced various illustrations for Esquire Magazine and participated in the Federal Art Project. Martínez was a disciple of Frank Lloyd Wright at Taliesin, where he began to experiment with the Art Deco style.

In Colombia, Martínez was awarded the gold medal in the 1940 Salón de Artistas Colombianos and was again awarded the top prize in 1941. In 1947, Martinez Delgado painted the mural at the Salón Elíptico in the Colombian Congress Building, considered one of the greatest murals of the 20th century. Martínez was then awarded La Orden De Boyaca (Colombia's highest government honor). Martinez was at the top of the Latin-American fine-arts scene when he died at the age of 47.

Biography

Genealogy

Martinez's ancestry profoundly influenced his art choices and books. Born into an aristocratic family in Bogotá, his father was the Conservative party leader Luis Martinez and his mother Mercedes Delgado Mallarino. It was a difficult childhood due to his father's expulsion from Colombia as a result of an indictment for his involvement in an earlier Coup d'état.

Early years

Martinez began studying art by age 11 under the instruction of Colombian Master Roberto Pizano and following Andrés de Santa Maria at the Bogotá Fine Arts Academy.
In 1925, he moved to Cartagena, where, at the age of 18, he directed and illustrated some sections for the newspaper "La Patria" under the pseudonym of "Sanmardel".

Chicago and Taliesin

Soon after, in 1926, Martínez traveled to Chicago, where he studied and worked for over five years at the Fine Arts Institute of Chicago under the tutoring of Ruth VanSickle Ford. In Chicago, Martínez befriended and worked alongside Edward Hopper, Isamu Noguchi, Willem de Kooning and Edgar Kaufmann Jr., among others.
Wright was quoted: "Young Santiago's brush lines are elegant and his attitude gracious."
In 1929, Martínez was awarded first prize for the "Best advertisement illustration" by the US Federation of Commercial Artists. Shortly after, he won the Logan Medal for the Arts for his mural: "Colombian evolution" at the 1933 Chicago International World Fair and exposition. At the fair, Martínez also assisted with the Murals at the General Motors Exhibit, as Diego Rivera's commission was cancelled due to the Lenin controversy in New York.

Back in Colombia

Martínez returned to Colombia in 1934 with an innovative line pioneering in the pictorial Art Deco style. 
In 1936, Martínez founded the Art school and decoration at the Universidad Javeriana Femenina.
From 1937 to 1940, he directed and illustrated the magazine "Revista Vida", which became the main outlet for cultural media at the time. It featured interviews of world-renowned artists like Joan Miró and writers like his longtime friend Gabriela Mistral. He also made various illustrations for the America, Anarkos, Cromos and PAN Magazines.

Madonna dilemma

Martinez, who was an avid historian and protector of the Colombian artistic heritage, discovered a painting by Raphael de Urbino. This discovery started a debate among Colombian scholars that is now referred to as "The dilemma of (La Madonna de Bogotá). Martinez Delgado managed to prove the provenance of the piece along with its authenticity with the use of X rays and detailed forensic work. In 1939, he took the painting to New York City during the 1939 World's Fair, where experts from the Metropolitan Museum, the Chicago Art Institute and the Louvre examined the painting. Among the experts were: Daniel Catton, Rich A. Sweet, Ruber H. Clark, Leo A. Marzolo, Adolfo Venturiy and Wilhelm Valentiner. They all concurred with Master Martinez and confirmed its authenticity. The painting was included in the artist's catalog as the "Madonna of Bogotá.''

Golden years

In 1940, Martínez participated in the first Salón de Artistas Colombianos, where he won the Gold Medal for the oil on canvas "El que volvió"; the subsequent year, he won first prize for the oil on canvas "Interludio". (Today at the Colombian National Museum).
In 1943, Martínez made his first major mural in Colombia at the school Presentación of Chapinero.
In 1945, started work on the Cúcuta Cathedral stations, as well as the murals and carvings at the city's government building.
That year, Martínez also illustrated the biography of Sucre realized by Carlos Arturo Caparroso (Editorial Horizontes, Bogotá), and was designated as a Member of the Historic Academy of Bogotá.
In 1947, Martinez was commissioned by the Honorable Alberto Lleras Camargo, then-director of the OEA, and the Honorable Laureano Gómez, the Inter-American Conference organizer, to create the mural for the elliptic chamber of the National Congress Building.
He finished the fresco in time for the Inter American conference. General George Marshall of the US called the piece a wonder of contemporary art, and was relieved that the capitol was spared from the fires during the Bogotazo. Martinez was given the Cruz de Boyacá award by President Mariano Ospina Pérez
Martinez also became the premier historian on Simón Bolívar and his army during the 1940s and 1950s. His limited edition Iconography on Bolivar is considered the most accurate work on the image and resalable of Simón Bolívar.

Early death

In 1948, Martínez founded a commercial art studio. In the following years, he made various well-recognized brand logos, illustrations, history books, and over 30 majestic murals in addition to many of his best known paintings.
During this period, he wrote and directed the dramatization of radio scripts, such as "El Virrey Solis", that broke all the ratings records for that year. Martínez also made plays, including "Estampas místicas de la tierra del Señor", "Juan Manuel el Gavilán" (unedited) and "El derecho de nacer".
In 1953, he was commissioned by Nelson Rockefeller, to paint an oil on canvas of 8 x 4  meters (the largest Oil on Canvas in South America) for the Bank of New York in Bogotá, but he died before finishing it. It was placed on the bank, where it remains today as the largest oil on canvas in Colombia. Rockefeller, in a speech during the presentation of the painting to the public, called Martinez Delgado "the greatest Latin American artist of the decade". (Today the building is the Interior Ministry Building and City Bank donated the painting to the Colombian Government.)
Master Martinez died on January 12, in the hacienda "El Molino", of a stroke.
On August 3 of the same year, the National Museum, with the collaboration of the Education Ministry, organized an exposition in his honor.

Listing of selected works

Martinez produced over 100 paintings in his career, in addition to murals, produced illustrations for books, lithographs, a great number of drawings, dozens of sculptures, and various other projects, including a large number of books and published articles before passing at the age of 47. The list below has some of his most significant works.

Murals

 A century of Colombian evolution – 1933 3rd Pavilion Chicago World Fair - Chicago.
 Columns GE pavilion – 1933 General Electric Pavilion Chicago World Fair - Chicago.
 Bolivar and Santander in the Cucuta Congress – Elliptic Room of the National Congress - Bogotá.
 Ceiling fresco in the San Carlos Palace – Old presidential home, current foreign ministry - Bogotá.
 Fresco of Bavaria Building - Hall of the lobby old Bavaria Building - Bogotá.
 Building Caja Colombiana de Ahorros - Banco Santander - Bogotá.
 Cid Campeador – Cid Theater - Bogotá.
 El hombre - Theater Colombia -  Bogotá.
 Room Hotel Granada (Missing)- Bogotá.
 Windmills of Quixote – Walls of café El Molino - Bogotá.
 Rooms Club Campestre - Club Campestre de Medellín - Medellín.
 El Trabajador - Banco Comercial Antioqueño - Medellín.
 Sin Titulo - Banco de Colombia - Medellín.
 Los Proceres - Banco de Colombia - Cúcuta
 Episodes of Santander's Life – National Palace of Cúcuta - Cúcuta.
 Madono of el Molino - Hacienda el Molino - Madrid, Colombia

Sculpture

 Rock face at the front of the National Palace in Cúcuta - Cucuta
 The Carving Collection made at Taliesin - Private Collection - USA
 The head of John the Baptist - National Museum - Bogotá
 Carvings at the Polytechnic School - Bogotá

Paintings/various media

 Bolívar (Charcoal) - Private Collection
 Mío Cristo del Monte - Private Collection
 The stories of Grim - Private Collection
 An Afternoon at the Hacienda - Private Collection
 Conchita Cintrón - Private Collection
 Head of Girl - Private Collection
 Illustrations for Vida - over 300 - ?
 Door Church of San Francisco - ?

Oil on Canvas

 Interludio - Museo Nacional - Bogotá
 El que volvio - Private Collection
 Retrato de José María Cordovez Moure - Acadeima de Historia - Bogotá
 Gold Diggers - Private Collection
 Don Quixote de la Mancha - Private Collection
 The rice of Jesus in the Cross - Cucuta Cathedral - Cucuta
 Jesus meets with the Virgin Mery - Cucuta Cathedral - Cucuta

 Jesus and Pilates - Cucuta Cathedral - Cucuta
 Agony of Jesus - Cucuta Cathedral - Cucuta
 Jesus carrying the Cross - Cucuta Cathedral - Cucuta
 Natural resources of Colombia - Interior Ministry Building - Bogotá

Watercolors

 Luisita Kling Fernández - Private Collection
 Amanecida - Private Collection
 Castle of San Felipe of Barajas - Private Collection
 Afternoon in La Mancha - Private Collection
 El Picador - Private Collection
 Potranca - Private Collection
 María Cecilia Aparicio Concha - Private Collection
 Interior - Private Collection
 Notes of Cartagena - Gun Club - Bogotá
 Walls of Cartagena - Gun Club Bogotá
 Quixote - Private Collection
 Sancho Panza - Private Collection
 Sketch for the fresco of the Salón Elíptico - Private Collection
 Flight of the Ducks - Private Collection
 Head of Quixote - Private Collection
 Thinking Girl - Private Collection
 Hunting Trophy - Private Collection

 Sad Girl - Private Collection
 Head of Jesus - Private Collection
 Marina - Private Collection
 Procession - Private Collection
 Construction - Private Collection
 Mariscal Suere - Private Collection
 Home of Virrey Sámano - Private Collection
 Callejas of Santafé - Private Collection
 Cultural dresses of Colombia, Ecuador, Perú y Brasil - Private Collection
 Antonio José de Sucre, Mariscal de Ayacucho - Private Collection
 Bullfighters - Private Collection
 Sketch of the Fresco Molino Chapel in Cajicá - Private Collection
 The Te Flower - Private Collection

List of books by Martinez

Title: Ensayo iconográfico del gran mariscal de Ayacucho
Author: Santiago Martinez Delgado
Editorial:Bogotá : Ediciones de Santiago Martínez Delgado
Year: 1945
Title: In memoriam Belisario Caicedo González
Author: Santiago Martinez Delgado
Editorial: Cali : Carvajal
year: 19--
Title: A. J. de Sucre
Author: Santiago Martinez Delgado
Editorial: Bogotá : Tip. Prag
Year: 1945
Title: A propósito de don Gregorio Vásquez de Arce y Ceballos
Author: Santiago Martinez Delgado
Editorial: Bogotá Vida
Year: 1941
Title: El arte y la ciencia
Author: Santiago Martinez Delgado
Editorial:Bogotá Vida
Year: 1942
Title: Bolívar
Author: Santiago Martinez Delgado
Editorial: Santiago Martinez Edicion numerada 100
Year: 1944
Title:Carlos Polanco : discípulo de Zurbarán
Author: Santiago Martinez Delgado
Editorial:Bogotá Vida
Year:1939
Title:La casa colombiana : decoración de interiores
Author: Santiago Martinez Delgado
Editorial:Bogotá Sabado
Year: 1944
Title:El crimen de Berruecos
Author: Santiago Martinez Delgado
Editorial:Bogotá Vida
Year: 1942
Title:El tigre
Author: Santiago Martinez Delgado
Editorial:Bogotá Vida
year:1936
Title: Una reseña iconográfica del ejército y de las armas libertadoras
Author: Santiago Martinez Delgado
Editorial: Bogotá Tipografía Praga
year: 1944

See also
Art Deco
Frank Lloyd Wright
Gabriela Mistral
Congress of Colombia
Colombian Art

Notes and references

Printed sources

Online sources

External links

Online Gallery of Master Martinez
Askart Market ifo about artist
Info from Luis Angel Arango Library
Website about Colombian Artists

1906 births
1954 deaths
School of the Art Institute of Chicago alumni
Muralists
People from Bogotá
20th-century Colombian sculptors
20th-century Colombian painters
20th-century Colombian male artists
Federal Art Project artists
Colombian male painters